Five-Star Thieves (Egyptian Arabic: لصوص خمس نجوم) is an Egyptian film released in 1994. The film is directed by Ashraf Fahmy and features Salah Zulfikar in the leading role as Galal Suleiman. The film is Salah Zulfikar's final film role.

Plot 
Galal Suleiman (Salah Zulfikar) is the manager of an investment bank where Shukri Abu Al-Fadl (Abu Bakr Ezzat) works as a legal advisor.  Shoukry plans with his friend Youssef Elwi (Mostafa Fahmy) to loot the bank's money.  Youssef arrives in Egypt and meets the director of the bank, Galal, and appears as a strong and honorable investor.  Youssef uses his charm and wealth to influence Lubna (Dalal Abdel Aziz), Galal's secretary, who is rebellious against her poor environment.

Main cast 

 Salah Zulfikar: Galal Suleiman
 Mustafa Fahmy: Youssef Elwi
 Dalal Abdel Aziz: Lubna
 Abu Bakr Ezzat: Shukri Abu Al-Fadl
 Ihab Nafea: Minister
 Abdullah Farghali: Lubna’s father
 Nahed Gabr: Sanaa
 Laila Fahmy: Lubna’s mother
 Inaam Al-Gretali: Mounira

See also 
 Salah Zulfikar filmography
 List of Egyptian films of 1994

References

External links 

 Five Star Thieves on elCinema

Egyptian drama films
1990s Arabic-language films
1994 films
Films shot in Egypt
1994 drama films